The Washington State University College of Agricultural, Human, and Natural Resource Sciences (CAHNRS) is one of the 11 colleges of Washington State University that offer undergraduate and graduate programs. Established as Washington Agricultural College and School of Science, the college started instructions on January 13, 1892. The college is in Pullman, Washington, and became a land-grant college after the passage of Morrill Act. The college provides education, research and services through fifteen academic departments, four research and extension centers, and thirty-nine county extension offices across the state of Washington. The college is known for apple production, grape growers and small grain genetics and breeding.

Departments
The college is divided into 12 departments and schools, which offer 22 majors and 19 minors. They include:

School of Economic Sciences
School of the Environment
School of Food Science
Department of Animal Sciences
Department of Apparel, Merchandising, Design and Textiles
Department of Biological Systems Engineering
Department of Crop and Soil Sciences
Department of Entomology
Department of Horticulture
Department of Human Development
Department of Plant Pathology
Institute of Biological Chemistry

Research institutes, laboratories, and centers

In the fiscal year 2008-09, the Agricultural Research Center of the college was awarded more than $33.5 million of grants and contracts for funded agricultural research. The Agricultural Research Centers includes 15 departments of the CAHNRS and the following institutes, laboratories, and Research centers:

Agricultural Weather Network
Center for Precision & Automated Agricultural Systems
Center for Sustaining Agriculture and Natural Resources
Composite Materials and Engineering Center
Institute of Biological Chemistry
Long Beach Research and Extension Unit
WSU Mt. Vernon Northwestern Washington Research and Extension Center
WSU Prosser Irrigated Agriculture Research and Extension Center
WSU Puyallup Research and Extension Center
WSU Wenatchee Tree Fruit Research and Extension Center
WSU Pullman Plant Growth Facilities

References

External links

Washington State University
Agricultural universities and colleges in the United States
Educational institutions established in 1892
Agriculture in Washington (state)
1892 establishments in Washington (state)